Kostiantyn Ilin (born 26 March 1975) is a leading Ukrainian strongman competitor and entrant to the World's Strongest Man.

Biography
Born in Chernivtsi, Ukraine, Ilin took to strongman competition relatively late at the age of 30. Within four years, he was his country's national champion, winning the 2009 Ukraine's Strongest Man contest.

In 2009, he continued to impress and was invited to the  2009 World's Strongest Man in a field described as the best ever. He did not make the final in a group whose top two were Derek Poundstone and Louis-Philippe Jean.

Ilin qualified for the 2010 World's Strongest Man but was again unable to qualify for the finals.

Ilin broke Derek Poundstone's world record in the 95 kg (209 lb) circus dumbbell with 10 repetitions during the Strongman Champions League event in Kyiv, Ukraine on 18 December 2010.

Personal records

Leg press: 1350 kg × 52 reps
Bench press: 220 kg
Squat: 380 kg
Deadlift: 385 kg

References

Ukrainian strength athletes
1975 births
Living people
Sportspeople from Chernivtsi